NCAA Final Four Basketball is a video game developed by Bitmasters and published by Mindscape for the Sega Genesis and SNES.

Gameplay
NCAA Final Four Basketball is a game which makes use of the top 64 college basketball teams as well as their official team logos. The player can take control of all five players on the team. The game offers two different practice modes in addition to the main game.

Reception
Next Generation reviewed the SNES version of the game, rating it two stars out of five, and stated that "It's pretty looking, but dull."

Reviews
Nintendo Power #65 (1994 October)
GamePro (May, 1995)
Video Games & Computer Entertainment - Feb, 1995

References

1994 video games
College basketball video games in the United States
Mindscape games
NCAA video games
Sega Genesis games
Super Nintendo Entertainment System games
Video games developed in the United States